Taboo is a comics anthology edited by Steve Bissette that was designed to feature edgier and more adult comics than could be published through mainstream publishers. The series began as a horror anthology, but soon branched out into other genres as well. It was published by various imprints from 1988 to 1995.

Taboo most notably serialized Alan Moore and Eddie Campbell's From Hell, Moore and Melinda Gebbie's Lost Girls, and Tim Lucas, Mike Hoffman and David Lloyd's Throat Sprockets, which became the basis of Lucas' novel of the same name. It also featured work by Moebius, Chester Brown, Neil Gaiman, Dave Sim, Michael Zulli, Al Columbia, and Charles Vess.

Publication history 
Each issue of Taboo was at least one hundred pages long, featuring many stories per issue. Bissette's own imprint Spiderbaby Grafix & Publications published the first seven issues, as well as a "Taboo Especial" one-shot, from 1988 until 1992. Kitchen Sink Press put out two additional issues in 1995.

Awards
Taboo won the "Best Anthology" Eisner Award in 1993.

Notes

References

External links
Taboo Origins series on Steve Bissette's site
Issue by Issue guide

Tundra Publishing titles
Kitchen Sink Press titles
Comics anthologies
Horror comics
Eisner Award winners for Best Anthology